Nordfjorden or Nordfjord (meaning "Northern Fjord" in Norwegian) may refer to:

Regions
Nordfjord, a traditional district making up the northern third of Sogn og Fjordane county, Norway

Fjords
Nordfjorden (Agder), a fjord in Risør municipality, Agder county, Norway 
Nordfjord (Greenland), a fjord in the NE Greenland National Park area in East Greenland
Nordfjorden (Svalbard), a fjord arm off the main Isfjorden in Svalbard, Norway
Nordfjorden (Vestland), a large fjord in the northern part of Vestland county, Norway

Villages
Nordfjord, Finnmark, an abandoned village in Båtsfjord municipality, Troms og Finnmark county, Norway